Mârzănești is a commune in Teleorman County, Muntenia, Romania. It is composed of four villages: Cernetu, Mârzănești, Teleormanu and Valea Părului.

References

Communes in Teleorman County
Localities in Muntenia